The March 1990 Central United States tornado outbreak affected portions of the United States Great Plains and Midwest regions from Iowa to Texas from March 11 to March 13, 1990. The outbreak produced at least 64 tornadoes across the region, including four violent tornadoes; two tornadoes, which touched down north and west of Wichita, Kansas, were both rated F5, including the tornado that struck Hesston. In Nebraska, several strong tornadoes touched down across the southern and central portion of the state, including an F4 tornado (possibly a family of tornadoes) that traveled for  making it the longest tracked tornado in the outbreak. Two people were killed in the outbreak, one each by the two F5 tornadoes in Kansas.

Overview
On March 12, upper-air maps indicated a high-pressure area situated over the Southeastern United States and a closed low-pressure area and accompanied trough entrenched across western portions of the country. Southwesterly flow across the Rocky Mountains proved favorable for low-level lee cyclogenesis, and surface analyses late on March 12 depicted the formation of a  low-pressure area over eastern Colorado. In the lower levels of the atmosphere, a low-level jet stretching from southern Texas into Iowa invigorated the northward transport of moisture from the Gulf of Mexico. The moisture became entrenched in the warm sector of the low-pressure area, to the east of a well-defined dryline extending from western Kansas into western Texas. Overnight on March 12 into the morning hours of March 13, widespread convection developed across Oklahoma and progressed northeastward into Kansas and Iowa, to the south of a quasi-stationary weather front, leaving a distinct outflow boundary across central and eastern Kansas. Early on March 13, morning atmospheric soundings across the Great Plains indicated an increasingly volatile atmosphere, with warming surface temperatures, strengthening low-level wind fields, and veering winds aloft. A modified atmospheric profile near Hesston, Kansas, indicated convective available potential energy around 3,200 J/kg already in place at 12:00 UTC. In general, weather researchers remarked that the overarching pattern on March 13, 1990, was a synoptically-evident pattern reminiscent of past tornado outbreaks. The National Severe Storms Forecast Center – known in modern times as the Storm Prediction Center – responded to this pattern by issuing a broad Moderate risk for severe weather across a wide swath of the Great Plains.

As the trough continued its approach from the west, upper-air plots showed enhanced diffluence focused across much of the region. The increasing atmospheric pressure gradient associated with this feature continued to enhance convergence along the dryline, while the influence of warm daytime temperatures exceeding  pushed the dryline eastward into western Oklahoma. Continued southwesterly flow around the mid-level low over Utah, Wyoming, and Colorado advected cold mid-level temperatures northeastward toward Kansas, Oklahoma, and Texas. Steep mid-level lapse rates further contributed to destabilization of the atmosphere, while moisture content and vertical wind profiles continued to improve. Low-level winds out of the southeast by the evening of March 13 further contributed to convergence along the dryline, which would become the focal point for several tornadic supercells over the ensuing hours as mid-level winds near  intersected the region. Additional supercells developed along the outflow boundary in Kansas, notably the Hesston tornado family.

Confirmed tornadoes

(based on NOAA Storm Data)

March 11 event

March 12 event

March 13 event

Hesston and Goessel tornado family

The F5 tornadoes that struck Hesston and Goessel were both spawned by the same supercell thunderstorm. They were part of what is known as a tornado family; a family that included several additional touchdowns after the Goessel storm dissipated.

The first tornado of the Hesston storm touched down at approximately 4:34 p.m. CDT just to the northeast of Pretty Prairie. It was initially between 200 and 500 yards in diameter, and caused minimal (F1-F2) damage as it churned between Castleton and the Cheney Reservoir. Photographic evidence suggests significant widening as the tornado approached Haven and the Arkansas River. The damage path ranged between 1/2 and 3/4 miles near Haven, and several homes were completely demolished indicating F4 damage. Had the tornado moved through a more populated area in this stage of its life, it is likely that it would have caused much more dramatic damage. Fairly constant F3 damage was produced from Haven to Burrton and to the Little Arkansas River.

Photographs suggest what appears to be a re-organization of the tornadic circulation; initially a wedge like appearance, the funnel quickly became tall and narrow. The most significant damage was done in this stage, however. The tornado plowed into the town of Hesston, just northwest of Newton on I-135. A total of 226 homes and 21 businesses were destroyed, and several were swept completely from their foundations with only slabs and empty basements remaining. A few of the homes were anchor-bolted to their foundations. Several industrial buildings were also obliterated, trees in town were completely shredded, and vehicles were thrown and severely mangled or stripped down to their frames. Portions of the damage path in Hesston were rated F5. 20 farms were torn apart in rural areas outside of town. One person died and 59 people were injured.

The series of events that occurred as the tornado moved past the Hesston area were most interesting. Eyewitness accounts observed the touchdown of an additional tornado just to the north. This is consistent with models of what is known as a "tornado handoff", in which an old mesocyclone and tornado occlude as a new mesocyclone and tornado further downwind becomes dominant. Over the course of a few miles, the new tornado intensified and the original one abruptly constricted and apparently became a satellite tornado to the new tornado. Eventually, the Hesston tornado (after traveling nearly ) occluded and merged with the new tornado, and the supercell began to re-intensify. The new tornado rapidly became very large, and violent damage was produced by the second tornado in Marion County. Several homes were again obliterated and completely swept away, at least one of which was well-anchored to its foundation, and one additional fatality was reported. The tornado produced very severe cycloidal ground scouring in farm fields, and damage near the town of Goessel was "extreme F5" according to NWS damage surveyors. The severity of the damage left behind by this tornado led some meteorologists to believe that the Goessel tornado was among the strongest ever documented at that time.

The same supercell would produce another long-tracked F2 tornado that damaged many farms and destroyed four homes on the southern side of Dwight.

See also
 List of North American tornadoes and tornado outbreaks

References

 NOAA Storm Data

External links
 "Monster on the Prairie, Hesston, Kansas 1990"
 Video of the tornado
 Dangerous Tornado Hits My House!

F5 tornadoes
Tornadoes of 1990
Tornadoes in Iowa
Tornadoes in Kansas
Tornadoes in Nebraska
Tornadoes in Oklahoma
1990 natural disasters in the United States
March 1990 events in the United States